Benoît Ramognino (born 18 Mai 1968, in Paris, France)

He is an art dealer specialized in design furniture of the twentieth century, pop culture and utopic architecture of the 20th century.

Benoît Ramognino promotes furniture of Quasar Khanh, Verner Panton , Luigi Colani ,and architecture by Matti Suuronen.

Profession 
Antiquaire depuis 1987, Expert CEA et CEFA depuis 2001 Membre du SNA, syndicat national des antiquaires depuis 2005.

1987 -1996 Première boutique à Saint-Ouen, aux puces de Clignancourt, marché Paul Bert, «Baby Boom Plastic », premier marchand à proposer du mobilier et des jouets des années 70 aux puces de Saint-Ouen.

1996- 2009 Fondateur et directeur de XXO : Xtra Xtra Original: Société leader dans le marché du mobilier vintage, constitution d'un des stock les plus important d'Europe de créations des années 1960-2000. Vente de collection au Centre Georges Pompidou, musée des Arts Décoratifs, participe à l'exposition-rétrospective « Pop design » au Centre Georges Pompidou en 2004, premier participant aux «Puces du design » en 1999, et instigateur des premières ventes aux enchères sur le mobilier design, achète une grande partie de tout les fond de mobilier des designers français encore disponible.

2009 -2011 Professeur à l'EAC et directeur de thèse, cours sur le "marché du design" pour des étudiants en master 4ème année.

2010 : Expert pour Joël Garcia organisation sur le salon « Design Elysée », Paris

2010-2014: Expert officiel pour Fabien Bonillo sur la manifestation " les Puces du Design", Paris

2010-2014 : Directeur de la Velvet Galerie, 11 rue guenegaud, 75006, Paris, Espace dédié à la "Pop culture" du 20 ieme siècle.

2013-2014 : Organisateur des ventes aux enchères 1960-1980 génération jouets à Drouot, directeur du département Pop culture dans l'étude Boisgirard-Antonini

2013: Ouverture d'un espace d'exposition dans une Maison Futuro aux Puces de Saint-Ouen , Marché Dauphine.

2014: élu Vice-président de la CEFA, chambre d'expert liée au sncao.

Curator

1998 Exposition "THE INFLATABLE MOMENT" : PNEUMATICS AND PROTEST IN '68 par Marc Dessauce et l'Architectural League of New York, à l'Urban Center de New York (1998),

2000 Exposition : Air Air show, Grimaldi forum, Monaco,

2010 " A bout de souffle..! " Salon Design Elysées, Paris, Benoît Ramognino, collection Privée.

2012 " Quasar Khanh, pionnier du mobilier gonflable " , Puces du design 2012, Velvet galerie/Galerie 47.

2014 exhibition at Marché Dauphine, flea marcket of paris with inflatable furniture of Quasar Khanh.

Benoît Ramognino est expert auprès de la CEA et de la CEFA. Membre du Syndicat National des Antiquaires.

Artists and designers represented 

Quasar Khanh
Verner Panton
Luigi Colani 
Joe Colombo 
Matti Suuronen
NeO Tony LEE

References

External links
Exposition de mobilier design
Le site de la velvet galerie
Vidéo de la Vente à Drouot, Génération Jouets

Living people
1968 births
French art dealers
Businesspeople from Paris